Marco Reginelli (January 2, 1897 – May 26, 1956), also known as "Small Man", was an Italian-American New Jersey mobster who became underboss of the Philadelphia crime family and operated a famous nightclub in Atlantic City, New Jersey. Reginelli's nickname came from his short stature.

Early life
Reginelli was born in Nepezzano, in Abruzzo, Italy in 1897. He immigrated to the United States in 1914, after his brother Nazareno. He first settled in an Italian-American community in Penns Grove, New Jersey, with many neighbors from Valle San Giovanni and Teramo. Many of these immigrants worked at the nearby DuPont chemical factory. In the 1930s, Reginelli moved to Camden, New Jersey, where he became a member of the Cosa Nostra.

Criminal career
Reginelli's specialty was gambling and the numbers racket, A congressional committee once described Reginelli as "the top hoodlum in the Philadelphia-New Jersey area".

Reginelli eventually extended his influence to the resort area of Atlantic City. It is alleged that Reginelli may have had a hand in financing the 500 Club, a nightclub run by Paul "Skinny" D'Amato in Atlantic City from 1946 to 1973. In the early 1950s, the 500 Club frequently presented singer Dean Martin, who first performed with comedian and future partner Jerry Lewis at the club. 

The Federal Government unsuccessfully tried to deport Reginelli to Italy. They also failed to block his citizenship application; Reginelli was finally naturalized as a U.S. citizen in June 1955, but was stripped of his citizenship in January 1956.

Marco Reginelli died from natural causes in 1956, at age 59. He's buried in the Calvary Cemetery in Cherry Hill, New Jersey. Reginelli's successor as underboss was Dominick Olivetto.

References

External links

 

1897 births
1956 deaths
Italian emigrants to the United States
People from Camden, New Jersey
People from Teramo
American gangsters of Italian descent
Philadelphia crime family
Nightclub owners
Burials in New Jersey